Shailender Singh Sodhi , commonly known as Shellee, is an Indian poet, film lyricist and writer. He commonly works in Bollywood. He was born in Chandigarh, India.

Early life 
His father Himmat Singh Sodhi, is a poet and a writer.

Shellee wrote poetry and stories from an early age.  After studying at DAV School, Ambala cantonment, he studied theater from Ambala Cantt and Panjab University, Chandigarh. In 1995 he moved to Mumbai to assist Gulzar. Though he wanted to act, he was not a skilled actor.

He was a Censor Board member for four years. In 2008, Anurag Kashyap  approached him to write the lyrics for Dev.D. Known for introducing new words in his lyrics, he rose to fame quickly.

He says he got the name "Shellee", when one of his teachers, who was a fan of English poet PB Shelley, started calling him Shelley. The nickname later became 'Shellee.'

Career
He has worked as lyricist and background music composer for various Bollywood films including the critically acclaimed Dev D. and Udta Punjab. He is working on a documentary film on the Hakka community living in Kolkata for many generations.

Filmography
Dev.D (2009)
Luv Shuv Tey Chicken Khurana (2012)
 Shahid (2013)
 Jugni (2016)
 Udta Punjab (2016)
 Phillauri (2017)
 Lust Stories (2018), a series on Netflix
 Veere Di Wedding (2018)
 Manmarziyaan (2018)
 Jai Mummy Di (2020)
 Jawaani Jaaneman (2020)
 Hum Do Hamare Do (2021)
 Jersey (2022)
 Pippa (2022)
 Almost Pyaar with DJ Mohabbat (2023)

References 

Indian lyricists
Living people
People from Ambala district
1970 births